Jamie Morgan is a British photographer, filmmaker, and former musician.

Music career

Morgan formed half of the duo Morgan-McVey who released just one single, 1986's Stock Aitken Waterman-produced "Looking Good Diving" b/w "Looking Good Diving with the Wild Bunch". Originally conceived as a Simon & Garfunkel-style male vocal duo who would harmonise over reggae beats, early demos failed to deliver on the concept. Facing creative inertia, the act's record company convinced them to work with rising pop producers Stock Aitken Waterman, a proposition that left them with mixed feelings. Morgan says "Looking Good Diving" co-vocalist Cameron McVey was so "embarrassed" by the resulting record and video, the band disintegrated.

However, the single's B-side, which Morgan co-wrote, would soon evolve into Neneh Cherry's "Buffalo Stance", which reached number three in the UK Singles Chart and the top 10 around the world in 1988. Morgan says he helped facilitate the track's transformation into a hit, after accidentally meeting its remixer, DJ Tim Simenon, while attempting to evade a stalker who was trying to kill him.

As a solo artist under the name Jamie J. Morgan, he released a cover of the Lou Reed song "Walk on the Wild Side" in 1990, which reached the top 30 in the UK and Australia, and number one in New Zealand. An album, Shotgun, was also released in 1990.

Photography and filmmaking
Since retiring as a recording artist, Morgan has concentrated on photography and filmmaking. He has directed numerous music videos and the 2007 documentary film The Workshop.

Discography

Albums

Singles

References

External links 
 Jamie Morgan official site
 
 

English pop singers
English photographers
English filmmakers
Living people
Year of birth missing (living people)